Kharbozan-e Bala (also Romanized as Kharbozān-e Bālā; also known as Kharbozān) is a village in Seyyed Ebrahim Rural District, Zarrinabad District, Dehloran County, Ilam Province, Iran. At the 2006 census, its population was 151, in 32 families. The village is populated by Kurds.

References 

Populated places in Dehloran County
Kurdish settlements in Ilam Province